Lasher is the second novel in the Anne Rice series Lives of the Mayfair Witches.

Lasher may also refer to:

 Lasher (comics), a supervillain in the Marvel Universe
 Lasher Creek, near Randall, New York
 Lasher Spur, Antarctica
 Lasher-Davis House, a historic home in Nelliston, Montgomery County, New York
 Father-Lasher (Myoxocephalus scorpius), a fish

People with the surname
 Fred Lasher (born 1941), American baseball player
 Howard L. Lasher (1944–2007), American politician
 Count Lasher (1921–1977), Jamaican singer and songwriter

See also